Stratford is an unincorporated community in Grant County, Washington, United States. Stratford has a post office with ZIP code 98853.

References

Unincorporated communities in Grant County, Washington
Unincorporated communities in Washington (state)